"Tukoh Taka" is the 2022 FIFA Fan Festival anthem performed by Trinidadian-born rapper Nicki Minaj, Colombian singer Maluma and Lebanese singer Myriam Fares. It was released by FIFA for the 2022 FIFA World Cup soundtrack on November 18, 2022, through Universal Arabic Music and Republic Records along with an accompanying music video.

Composition 
The song features the three artists' languages in the lyrics: Minaj's English, Maluma's Spanish, and Fares' Arabic, becoming the first world championship anthem to feature all three languages. Fares said in a statement: "'Tukoh Taka', the song that I was honored to participate in its composition, arrangement, and choreography, made me more passionate about it, in addition to working alongside two of my favorite international artists, Nicki Minaj and Maluma. I truly wish that 'Tukoh Taka' will be transmitting the Eastern culture and Arabian music to the whole world.”

The song has reggaeton, Pop and house-rap sounds.

The name of the song is said to be Arabic for "knock-knock", with fans and commenters also recognising it to sound like "tiki-taka", a style of football play.

Critical reaction 
Forbess writer Chris Malone Méndez said the pairing of the two international artists with the Arab singer "was a natural choice for optimal global reach" but, while appreciating the song's trilingualism, noted that "no Qatari artists are featured on any World Cup songs".

The song received negative reactions in the Arab world. Fans and critics accused Myriam Fares of imitating Shakira's dancing style and overall aesthetics. According to Haaretz, numerous online critics said the song had "annoying lyrics".

Controversy 

After the announcement of their collaboration for the World Cup anthem, the three artists were criticised for choosing to be paid to sing a song in an Emirate whose internal policies violate LGBT rights and support perceived slavery. Singer Maluma replied to the charge by declaring: "it's something I can't resolve; [...] It's not something that I actually have to be involved with. I'm here enjoying my music and the beautiful life, playing soccer too". FIFA has also been under fire online for featuring Fares considering her blackface stunt in her "Goumi" (2018) music video.

Music video 
The music video, directed by Edgar Esteves and Juan Felipe Zuleta, features Maluma and Fares performing in the Qatari desert, while Minaj performs her verses aboard a bus, all alternating with some clips of soccer players cheering after goals.

Charts

References 

2022 songs
2022 singles
FIFA World Cup official songs and anthems
Nicki Minaj songs
Maluma songs
Myriam Fares songs
Republic Records singles
Universal Music Group singles
Macaronic songs